Collin Croal (born in Guyana) is a Guyanese politician. He is the Minister of Housing and Water in Guyana. He was appointed Minister in August 2020 by President Irfaan Ali.

References 

Living people
People's Progressive Party (Guyana) politicians
Members of the National Assembly (Guyana)
Government ministers of Guyana
Year of birth missing (living people)